The 1970 San Diego State Aztecs football team represented San Diego State College during the 1970 NCAA University Division football season as a member of the Pacific Coast Athletic Association. The team was led by head coach Don Coryell, in his tenth year, and played home games at San Diego Stadium in San Diego, California. They finished the season as co-champions of the conference, with a record of nine wins and two losses (9–2, 5–1 PCAA).

Schedule

Team players in the NFL
The following were selected in the 1971 NFL Draft.

The following finished their SDSU career in 1970, were not drafted, but played in the NFL.

Team awards

Notes

References

San Diego State
San Diego State Aztecs football seasons
Big West Conference football champion seasons
San Diego State Aztecs football